Juggernaut is the second solo studio album by Canadian rock guitarist Frank Marino, released in 1982. The original Mahogany Rush drummer Jimmy Ayoub was replaced by Timm Biery for this album.

A remastered version of Juggernaut and Marino's previous album The Power of Rock 'n' Roll was released on August 6, 2012, under the moniker Frank Marino & Mahogany Rush.

Track listing 
All songs by Frank Marino.

 "Strange Dreams" - 5:05 
 "Midnight Highway" - 3:44
 "Stories of a Hero" - 8:01
 "Free" - 5:18
 "Maybe It's Time - 6:06 
 "Ditch Queen" - 6:38
 "For Your Love" - 4:36
 "Juggernaut" - 4:59

Personnel
Frank Marino - Lead Guitar, Keyboards, Lead Vocals
Vince Marino - Rhythm Guitar
Paul Harwood - Bass
Timm Biery - Drums
Greg Nichols - Keyboard

Charts
The album charted in the Billboard 200 chart, and peaked at 185. Strange Dreams charted at #9 on the Hot Mainstream Rock Tracks chart.

References

1982 albums
Frank Marino albums
Columbia Records albums